Abismo de pasión (Abyss of Passion) is a Mexican telenovela produced by Angelli Nesma Medina and written by Caridad Bravo Adams for Televisa. It is a remake of Cañaveral de Pasiones, produced by Humberto Zurita and Christian Bach in 1996. Both telenovelas are based on Caridad Bravo Adams's original story, divided into two novels, and published in 1959: Una sombra entre los dos and Al pie del altar.

Episodes

References

Lists of Mexican television series episodes